This is a list of notable earthquakes that have taken place in the history of Ethiopia.

Earthquakes

References

Further reading
 

Lists of earthquakes by country
Earthquakes in Ethiopia
Earthquakes